Caroline E. Knop (born January 25, 1996) is a volleyball player. She plays for the United States women's volleyball team. She participated in the  2018 FIVB Volleyball Women's Nations League.

Career 
She played for the University of Michigan and University of Florida.

Coaching 
Knop joined Florida's volleyball staff as a volunteer assistant coach, starting in the 2022 season. Prior to Florida, she spent three seasons as an assistant coach at College of Charleston.

References

External links 
 Player info Team USA
 FIVB profile

1996 births
Living people
American women's volleyball players
American volleyball coaches
American expatriate sportspeople in Germany
Expatriate volleyball players in Germany
Sportspeople from Pasadena, California
Michigan Wolverines women's volleyball players
Florida Gators women's volleyball players
Florida Gators women's volleyball coaches